The Political Zoo is a book written by the American conservative talk radio host Michael Savage. The book is unlike Savage's previous works (The Savage Nation (2003), The Enemy Within (2004), Liberalism is a Mental Disorder (2005) in that it is a parody of 51 public figures, of both liberal and conservative political figures and celebrities (and at least one Socialist). The book contains political cartoons of politicians, celebrities and media personalities, all of whom are parodied with a story and a satirical binomial nomenclature, in that the various personalities are given a pseudo-genus and pseudo-species, in such a way as to slight the personality being mentioned, in most cases.

The book peaked at number four on the New York Times best sellers list in its first week.

The 51 personalities who appear in the book are:

References

2006 non-fiction books
Political books
Satirical books
Books by Michael Savage